Victoria Crivelli (born 30 September 1990) is an Argentine handball player for Ferro Carril Oeste and the Argentina national team.

She participated at the 2011 World Women's Handball Championship in Brazil.

In Argentina, she currently plays for Ferro Carril Oeste, where she won the 2013 and 2014 Metropolitan Apertura  Tournament, as well as the 2014 National Championship.

Titles
Argentinean Clubs Championship: 2015

Individual awards and achievements

Best playmaker
2016 Pan American Women's Club Handball Championship

References

External links

1990 births
Living people
Argentine female handball players
Argentine people of Italian descent
Handball players at the 2016 Summer Olympics
Olympic handball players of Argentina
Pan American Games medalists in handball
Pan American Games silver medalists for Argentina
Handball players at the 2015 Pan American Games
Handball players at the 2019 Pan American Games
South American Games silver medalists for Argentina
South American Games medalists in handball
Competitors at the 2018 South American Games
Sportspeople from Buenos Aires
Medalists at the 2015 Pan American Games
Medalists at the 2019 Pan American Games
20th-century Argentine women
21st-century Argentine women